King of Kings is a 1961 American epic film directed by Nicholas Ray and produced by Samuel Bronston for Metro-Goldwyn-Mayer. Adapted from the New Testament, the film tells the story of Jesus of Nazareth from his birth and ministry to his crucifixion and resurrection. It stars Jeffrey Hunter as Jesus, with Siobhán McKenna, Robert Ryan, Viveca Lindfors, Ron Randell, Hurd Hatfield, and Rip Torn.

Throughout the 1950s, John Farrow began developing a proposed film project based on the life of Jesus, tentatively titled Son of Man. In November 1958, actual development started when Farrow partnered with Samuel Bronston following their collaboration on John Paul Jones (1959). By the next year, Farrow left the project due to creative differences, and Nicholas Ray was hired as director. Ray then hired screenwriter Philip Yordan to write a new script. Filming commenced in April 1960, and wrapped in October 1960.

Financing of the film was initially provided by Pierre S. du Pont III, but Bronston appealed for more funding from Metro-Goldwyn-Mayer, which was interested in the film following its success with Ben-Hur (1959). With MGM involved, mandatory rewrites and additional scenes were added to the film. Reshoots took place in December 1960 and again in May 1961.

The film premiered at Loew's State Theatre in New York City on October 11, 1961. It premiered in Los Angeles on October 12 and opened there on October 13. It received mixed reviews from film critics, but was a box office success. Miklós Rózsa was nominated for a Golden Globe Award for Best Original Score.

Plot
In 63 BC, Pompey conquered Jerusalem and the city was sacked. He entered the Temple to seize the treasure of Solomon and massacred the priests there. He discovered that the treasure is only a collection of scrolls of the Torah. These Pompey held over a fire until an old priest reached for them imploringly. Pompey relented and handed them to the old man and left to carry out massacres of enemy villages and towns.

Many years later, a series of rebellions break out against the authority of Rome, so the Romans crucify many of the leaders and place Herod the Great on Judea's throne.

A carpenter named Joseph and his wife Mary, who is about to give birth, arrive in Bethlehem for the census. Not having found accommodation for the night, they take refuge in a stable, where the child, Jesus, is born. The shepherds, who have followed the Magi from the East, gather to worship him. However, Herod, informed of the birth of a child-king, orders the centurion Lucius to take his men to Bethlehem and kill all the newborn male children.

Mary and Joseph flee to Egypt with the child. The Massacre of the Innocents occurs, Herod dies, killed in his death throes by his son Herod Antipas, who then takes power. In Nazareth, Jesus, who is now twelve years old, is working with Joseph when soldiers arrive under the command of Lucius, who knows now that Jesus escaped the massacre of the infants. But Lucius does nothing and only asks that Mary and Joseph register their son's birth before the year's end.

Years pass and Jewish rebels led by Barabbas and Judas Iscariot prepare to attack a caravan carrying the next governor of Judea, Pontius Pilate and his wife Claudia. The ambush fails, partly due to the diligence of Lucius, and Barabbas and Judas flee for their lives.

Pilate and Herod Antipas meet on the banks of the River Jordan, where John the Baptist preaches to the crowds. Jesus arrives here, now 30 years of age. He is baptized by John, who recognizes that he is the Messiah. Jesus goes into the desert, where he is tempted by Satan. After forty days, Jesus travels to Galilee, where he recruits his Apostles.

In Jerusalem, Herod Antipas arrests John the Baptist, who is visited by Jesus in prison. Judas leaves the rebel Barabbas and joins the Apostles. Jesus begins to preach and gather crowds, among which are Claudia, Pilate's wife, and Lucius. Herod reluctantly beheads John on a whim of his stepdaughter, Salome, who despises him.

Herod, Pilate and the High Priest Caiaphas are terrorized by the works and miracles of Jesus. Barabbas plots a revolt in Jerusalem during Passover, during which time Jesus enters the holy city in triumph and goes to the Temple to preach. The rebels storm the Antonia Fortress, but the legions of Pilate, having learned of the plot, ambush and crush the revolt, massacring the rebels,  leaving Barabbas as the sole survivor who ends up getting arrested.

Jesus meets the disciples on the evening of Thursday, having supper one last time with them and afterwards goes to pray at Gethsemane. In the meantime, Judas wants Jesus to free Judea from the Romans, and, to force his hand, Judas delivers him to the Jewish authorities. Jesus is brought before Caiaphas and then brought before Pilate. Pilate starts the trial, but sensing that the issue is one of Jewish sensibilities, sends him to Herod Antipas, who, in turn, sends him back.

Pilate is infuriated by Antipas' returning of Jesus and commands his soldiers to scourge Jesus. The people demand the release of Barabbas, and Pilate bows to their pressure and sentences Jesus to be crucified. Jesus, wearing a crown of thorns on his head, carries his cross to Golgotha where he is crucified with two thieves, one of them being the penitent thief Dismas and the other, the Impenitent thief, Gestas.

Desperate because he has betrayed Jesus to his death, Judas hangs himself and his body is found by Barabbas. Jesus dies in front of his mother, the apostle John, a few soldiers, Claudia (Pilate's wife), and Lucius (who utters the fateful words: "He is truly the Christ"). His body is taken down from the cross and is carried to a rock tomb. Two days later, Mary Magdalene finds the tomb empty, and encounters the Risen Jesus.

The film ends on the shores of Lake Tiberias when Jesus appears to the Apostles for "a final time" according to the narration, and tells them to bring his message to the ends of the world. Only his shadow is visible, forming the shape of a cross where it falls on the stretched-out fishing nets. The apostles then leave, and, as the shadow of Jesus falls across the screen, it could be assumed that he is ascending to Heaven.

Cast

 Jeffrey Hunter as Jesus
 Siobhán McKenna as Mary
 Hurd Hatfield as Pontius Pilate
 Ron Randell as Lucius of Cyrene
 Viveca Lindfors as Claudia Procula
 Rita Gam as Herodias
 Carmen Sevilla as Mary Magdalene
 Brigid Bazlen as Salomé
 Harry Guardino as Barabbas
 Rip Torn as Judas Iscariot
 Frank Thring as Herod Antipas
 Guy Rolfe as Caiaphas
 Royal Dano as Peter
 Robert Ryan as John the Baptist
 Edric Connor as Balthazar
 Maurice Marsac as Nicodemus
 Grégoire Aslan as Herod the Great
 George Coulouris as a camel driver
 Conrado San Martín as Pompey
 Gérard Tichy as Joseph
 Antonio Mayans as John the Apostle (credited as José Antonio)
 Luis Prendes as Dismas, the Penitent thief
 David Davies as burly man
 José Nieto as Caspar
 Rubén Rojo as Matthew
 Fernando Sancho as the demon-possessed man
 Michael Wager as Thomas
 Félix de Pomés as Joseph of Arimathea
 Adriano Rimoldi as Melchior
 Barry Keegan as Gestas, the Impenitent thief
 Rafael Luis Calvo as Simon of Cyrene
 Tino Barrero as Andrew
 Paco Morán as blind man of Bethsaida (credited as Francisco Moran)
Uncredited Cast
 John Kerr as a man at the Sermon on the Mount
 Ray Milland as the voice of Satan
 Orson Welles as the Narrator

Production

Development
In February 1951, it was reported that director John Farrow was developing a biographical film on the life of Jesus, with his script being titled Son of Man. He had also intended to produce the film independently for less than $800,000. By November 1951, the project was under development at the Nassour Studios and that Farrow was conducting a talent search for an actor in the title role. When asked of the requirements he desired, Farrow replied, "High personal character and a good actor." However, by August 1953, Farrow was contracted to direct The Sea Chase (1955) with Warner Bros. In February 1954, the Los Angeles Times reported that Farrow was likely to begin development on Son of Man following the completion of The Sea Chase (1955). It was speculated that it would be shot in England and Jesus would not be shown directly, although Farrow declined to confirm these statements. Shooting was scheduled to begin by summer 1954. It was ultimately set aside when, in April 1955, Farrow signed to direct Around the World in Eighty Days (1956), in which he was later fired from after nearly a week of shooting.

In January 1956, Variety reported that Farrow was in negotiations with RKO Pictures to finance and distribute Son of Man. Two months later, in March, Farrow began a talent search for an unknown actor to portray Jesus on the condition that he would not appear in another film, television, or stage production for up to 20 years. However, these plans were again postponed when, in October 1957, Farrow had signed on to direct John Paul Jones (1959) for Samuel Bronston. A year later, Farrow and Bronston had formed a production company, Brofar, as they planned to produce a second project.

In November 1958, it was reported that Bronston and Farrow were collaborating on a film project based on the life of Jesus. In May 1959, it was reported that Sonya Levien was hired to do a script polish. However, by October 1959, Farrow had left the project over creative differences. Farrow later explained that in the context of Jesus's trial, Bronston wanted him to "whitewash the Jewish leaders, and lay blame entirely on the Romans. I refused to make these changes. I quit." Additionally, according to associate producer Alan Brown, he stated that "his script was not really a script, it was the Four Gospels put down, and Sam called me and said, 'I cannot even understand this, it's all Thee and Thou and everything else.'"

In November 1959, Nicholas Ray signed on to direct the project. With set construction nearly complete, Ray then asked screenwriter Philip Yordan whom he previously worked with on Johnny Guitar (1954) to rewrite the script. Ray also explained, "I asked for him and made concessions to have him. They had asked me to write it. I didn't feel up to the responsibility; I am as impatient with the other writer on my own screenplay as with others."

Yordan recalled, "I didn't want to go to Spain, but he asked me to just come over there for the weekend. The picture was called Son of Man. Terrible title, and someone had taken chapters of the Bible and sort of tried to make it play." He then recommended re-titling the script to King of Kings. Yordan wrote a new script in six weeks which Bronston liked so much that he encouraged him to stay in Madrid, in which Yordan later went to co-write the script for El Cid (1961). Throughout the writing process, Yordan felt he did not find writing the movie to be difficult, in which he argued that "Christ was a loner. He's not much different than my usual character. The Western character. It's the same character. The man alone."

Furthermore, Bronston hired several Biblical scholars in order for the script to adhere to the Gospels, which included playwright Diego Fabbri and theologian professor George Kilpatrick, who wrote the books The Origins of the Gospel According to St. Matthew (1946) and The Trial of Jesus (1953). In March 1960, Bronston received approval of the script from Pope John XXIII, who met with the producer at the Vatican.

Casting

Several actors were considered to play the role of Jesus. In May 1959, it was reported that Alec Guinness had met with Bronston to discuss playing the role of Jesus. With Nicholas Ray as director, he considered Peter Cushing, Tom Fleming, Christopher Plummer, and Max von Sydow (who would later play the role in The Greatest Story Ever Told in 1965) for the role of Jesus. Ultimately, on April 21, 1960, Jeffrey Hunter was cast as Jesus. The idea to hire Hunter for the role came from John Ford, who suggested him to Nicholas Ray after directing him on The Searchers (1956). Ray also knew Hunter as he had directed him in The True Story of Jesse James (1957). Bronston agreed to the casting mainly because of the actor's striking eyes explaining that "I really chose him for his eyes. It was important that the man playing Christ have memorable eyes." After he finished filming for Hell to Eternity (1960), Hunter was approached for the role after being given the script to which he agreed.

Other prominent actors were pursued for supporting roles. In April 1960, it was reported that Orson Welles and Richard Burton were cast as Herod the Great and Herod Antipas respectively. Alternately, on April 21, on the same day as Hunter's casting, it was reported that Burton was attached to play a centurion and James Mason was being considered for Pontius Pilate. However, in the following month, Burton left the role when he was refused to be given top billing.

In May 1960, Grace Kelly had turned down the offer to portray Mary, mother of Jesus, in which the role later went to Siobhán McKenna while Hurd Hatfield was cast as Pontius Pilate. That same month, it was announced that Viveca Lindfors, Rita Gam, Frank Thring, and Ron Randell had joined the cast. Several of the supporting parts were cast with local English-speaking Spanish actors whom Bronston collected through a "workshop" program.

Filming and post-production
In 1959, Bronston had established his eponymous production studio in Spain where he observed the rugged countryside resembled Judea. Principal photography began on April 24, 1960, at the Sevilla and Chamartín Studios, near Madrid, where 396 sets were constructed for the film. Unfortunately, the Temple of Judea set at the Sevilla studios was blown down during a major windstorm. Bronston surveyed the site and ordered for the set to be rebuilt which was completed in three months.

The film was shot on multiple locations throughout Spain, one of which included the Venta de Frascuelas near the rocky terrains of Chinchón for the Sermon on the Mount scene where 7,000 extras were used. The Adaja in El Fresno was used to represent the Jordan River, as well as the Rambla de Lanujar in Almería for the wilderness where Jesus was tempted. The Añover de Tajo within the province of Toledo was substituted for the Mount of Olives. The municipalities of Manzanares el Real and Navacerrada were shot for the scenes set in Nazareth and Golgotha, the site where Jesus was crucified, respectively.

The film's shoot faced numerous complications. As with John Paul Jones (1959), Bronston secured the financing backing from business executive Pierre S. du Pont III, but months into the shoot, the production had run out of money. Metro-Goldwyn-Mayer became interested in investing as they saw the film as a potential rival to Ben-Hur (1959), which was still in wide release. MGM studio president Joseph Vogel visited the set in Madrid and viewed dailies of the unfinished film. Coming away impressed, he alerted production head Sol C. Siegel of the production in which he also visited the set. Siegel recommended various changes feeling the film was too long, needed more action, and had a weak ending. An original character named "David", portrayed by Richard Johnson, was written into the film to function as a bridge between the film's plot threads. Due to the heavy deviations being made to the film's shooting script, Nicholas Ray and Philip Yordan were no longer on speaking terms communicating only through walkie-talkies.

Midway during filming, in July 1960, cinematographer Franz Planer had fallen ill. Manuel Berengeur, who had worked with him since the start of production, replaced him, but MGM sent out contract cinematographer Milton R. Krasner to take over. In September, an automobile accident resulted in the death of Arthur Resse, who had been serving as a horse trainer, while also injuring actor Harry Guardino (who was portraying Barabbas) as the two were en route from a location outside Aranjuez, Spain. Around the same time, Ray, who was overwhelmed with the production woes, was temporarily replaced by Charles Walters. In October 1960, filming wrapped after 122 days.

During the film's post-production, the editing was done at the MGM studios in Culver City, California. At the studio's requests, certain scenes were re-shot and added, and among of the edits made was the deletion of Richard Johnson's scenes. Miklós Rózsa was hired to compose the score, which was recorded using a 74-piece symphony orchestra and a choir of 50 people. Ray Bradbury was brought in to construct a new ending as well as write narration in order to connect the disparate elements together. Bradbury wrote an ending in which the resurrected Jesus commissions the disciples to preach the Gospel. Then, he elevates as he walks towards the horizontal shores of Galilee leaving only his visible footprints to be covered with blowing dust. The disciples would also leave footprints in all four directions to be covered with dust. However, the ending was deemed too expensive to be filmed. Orson Welles was hired to provide the voice-over narration, which was recorded in London. Welles insisted on pronouncing the word 'apostles' with a hard 't', instead of the normally silent 't'.

Following a sneak preview, the studio felt another scene between Siobhán McKenna and Carmen Sevilla was needed, which was shot in the MGM-British Studios near London on May 8, 1961.

Release
In June 1960, Metro-Goldwyn-Mayer had acquired the distribution rights to the film with their intention to distribute the film for a roadshow theatrical release as a follow-up to Ben-Hur (1959).

Home media
King of Kings was released to DVD by Warner Home Video on February 6, 2003, and Blu-ray by Warner Home Video on July 28, 2009, and on March 29, 2011, respectively as a Region 1 widescreen disc. It has since been available for online streaming and download through Amazon, Apple iTunes Store and Vudu.

Reception

Critical reaction
Time wrote a negative review describing the film as "[i]ncontestably the corniest, phoniest, ickiest and most monstrously vulgar of all the big Bible stories Hollywood has told in the last decade". Bosley Crowther of The New York Times felt that the movie had "the nature of an illustrated lecture" and was a "peculiarly impersonal film that constructs a great deal of random action around Jesus and does very little to construct a living personality for Him." Variety praised the film as "a major motion picture by any standard" that not only "succeeds as spectacle" but also "succeeds in touching the heart." Philip K. Scheuer of the Los Angeles Times wrote, "It is not great art, nor is it the definitive photoplay about Jesus (will there ever be one?), but it is at least permeated by a soberness of purpose that, allowing for ordinary human fallibility, can be tacitly felt and respected. Technically, of course, it is far glossier than the C. B. DeMille movie of 1927, and very probably at least its equal in effectiveness. Dramatically, I think, it falls somewhere between the theatrical entertainment that was Ben-Hur and the spiritual but spiritless Francis of Assisi."

Harrison's Reports awarded its top grade of "Excellent" and declared that the film "will not only stamp its enduring imprint on the glorious history book of the motion picture industry, but will leave its memorable impact on the minds of all those millions who see it." Richard L. Coe of The Washington Post, however, panned the film as "a picture which never should have been made" due to the filmmakers' decision to present Jesus as "a universal, non-controversial figure," explaining that "to excise His dynamic, revolutionary concepts is to make His journey on earth a hollow ritual, a pointless fairy tale, an essay on How to Live Dangerously and Still Win." The Monthly Film Bulletin stated: "As, simply, a version of the infinitely well-known story, it has some curious interpolations (Christ's visit to John the Baptist in his cell) and omissions. The overwhelming failure, though, is in finding any kind of style, in imagery, dialogue or music, which goes beyond the most insipidly conventional kind of Bible illustrations."

Among later reviews, Leonard Maltin's home video guide awarded the film three-and-a-half stars out of four, and Geoff Andrew called it "one of the most interesting screen versions of the Gospels, adding that "some of the performances appear to lack depth, but one can't deny the effectiveness of Miklós Rózsa's fine score, and of Ray's simple but elegant visuals which achieve a stirring dramatic power untainted by pompous bombast." Musicians such as Grammy Award-winning Art Greenhaw have cited the movie as being an influence in their work and even their favorite film of all time. On the review aggregator website Rotten Tomatoes, King of Kings holds an approval rating of 85% based on 20 reviews with an average rating of 6.4/10 The website's critical consensus reads: "With enough narrative depth to anchor the expected spectacle, King of Kings is a true blessing for fans of Biblical epics."

The film's music score, composed by Miklós Rózsa, was nominated for a Golden Globe Award for Best Original Score. That same year, Rózsa was also nominated in the same category for his score of El Cid, which was produced by Bronston.

Box office
According to MGM records, the film earned $8 million in North America and $5.4 million overseas, earning a profit of $1,621,000. According to Kinematograph Weekly the film was considered a "money maker" at the British box office in 1962.

Legacy
The film is recognized by American Film Institute in these lists:
 2005: AFI's 100 Years of Film Scores – Nominated
 2006: AFI's 100 Years...100 Cheers – Nominated

See also

 The Greatest Story Ever Told – 1965 star-studded Hollywood epic about the life of Jesus Christ directed by George Stevens

References

Bibliography

External links

 
 
 
 
 King of Kings page at A Tribute to Jeffrey Hunter website

1961 films
1961 drama films
American epic films
Caiaphas
Cultural depictions of John the Baptist
Cultural depictions of Judas Iscariot
Cultural depictions of Pompey
Cultural depictions of Pontius Pilate
Cultural depictions of Saint Peter
Depictions of Herod the Great on film
1960s English-language films
Film portrayals of Jesus' death and resurrection
Films about Christianity
Films directed by Nicholas Ray
Films scored by Miklós Rózsa
Films set in the Roman Empire
Films shot in Almería
Films shot in Madrid
Films shot in the Community of Madrid
Films shot in the province of Ávila
Metro-Goldwyn-Mayer films
Portrayals of Mary Magdalene in film
Portrayals of Saint Joseph in film
Portrayals of the Virgin Mary in film
Religious epic films
Samuel Bronston Productions films
Cultural depictions of Salome
Films shot at MGM-British Studios
1960s American films
Films shot in Chinchón